Howard Ensign Simmons Jr. (June 17, 1929 – April 26, 1997) was an American chemist with DuPont who discovered the Simmons–Smith reaction.

Biography
He was born on June 17, 1929. In 1952, Simmons received the Charles Goodyear Medal.

In 1976, Simmons served as Chair of the Organic division of the American Chemical Society. He was a member of the American Academy of Arts and Sciences, the National Academy of Sciences, and the American Philosophical Society.

He died on April 26, 1997.

References

External links

 John D. Roberts and John W. Collette, "Howard Ensign Simmons, Jr.", Biographical Memoirs of the National Academy of Sciences (1999)

20th-century American chemists
DuPont people
1929 births
1997 deaths
National Medal of Science laureates
People from Norfolk, Virginia
Polymer scientists and engineers
Massachusetts Institute of Technology alumni
Scientists from Virginia
Members of the American Philosophical Society